V. Radhakrishnan may refer to:

 Velusami Radhakrishnan (born 1952), Sri Lankan politician
 Venkatraman Radhakrishnan (1929–2011), Indian scientist